Samuel Dixon (died 1769) was an Irish artist, known for his water colour paintings and his depictions of flowers and birds in  (embossed ).

Dixon's father was Thomas Dixon, a hosier, of Cork Hill. His brother John Dixon, was a mezzotint engraver.

In 1748, he was listed as a "picture dealer and painter" in Capel Street, Dublin, Ireland.

Dixon produced sets of twelve hand-coloured basso-relievo prints. He advertised the first, featuring floral arrangements, in Faulkner's Dublin Journal on 26 April 1748. The next year he followed these with a set of designs copied from volumes 1–4 of George Edward's Natural History of Uncommon Birds (1743–1751).

He employed a number of apprentices or pupils to hand-colour his prints, among them was  Gustavus Hamilton, Daniel O'Keeffe and James Reilly.

In later life he opened a shop in London and exhibited his works there, returning to Dublin in 1768. He returned to London, and died there on 27 January 1769.

Further reading

References 

Year of birth missing
Place of birth missing
1769 deaths
Irish watercolourists
Artists from Dublin (city)
Bird artists
Flower artists
Irish art dealers